Sergej Neubauer (born 14 April 1985) is a Kazakhstani former professional footballer who played as a midfielder.

Career 
Neubauer joined 1. FC Kaiserslautern in 2006 coming from fourth league club KSV Baunatal. In his first season, he had a place in the starting eleven of the second team playing in the Regionalliga Süd. During the 2007–08 season. he was given the opportunity to play six times for the first team by former FCK manager Kjetil Rekdal.

In the summer of 2009, Neubauer moved on to Rot-Weiss Essen and one year later to Sportfreunde Lotte.

References

1985 births
Living people
Sportspeople from Karaganda
Kazakhstani people of German descent
Kazakhstani footballers
Kazakhstani expatriate footballers
Expatriate footballers in Germany
1. FC Kaiserslautern II players
1. FC Kaiserslautern players
Rot-Weiss Essen players
Sportfreunde Lotte players
2. Bundesliga players
Association football midfielders